Loye-sur-Arnon (literally Loye on Arnon) is a commune in the Cher department in the Centre-Val de Loire region of France.

Geography

Its economic activity consists of ten farms ranging from 6-250 hectares and employing them in every 5 employees, 9 craftsmen and traders are also part of the local economy.

Several organizations are involved in the animation of the village: a festival committee, a brotherhood of St. Vincent, an association of parents "Grande Récrée" former tobacco growers, a fishing company and a friendly hunters .

The kindergarten, renovated in 2003, is part of the teaching grouping Arcomps - Ardenais - Loye sur Arnon, and the canteen (which hosts an average of 50 children per room) are located on the town. The canteen is run by an association of parents.
 
The village lies on the circuit of the pilgrims of Saint Jacques de Compostela, whose house to host the Old Forest, and is crossed by numerous hiking trails, one will discover the Roman Bridge (fully restored in 2002 under the aegis of Historical Monuments).

Since 2003, a multipurpose room with parking is part of municipal assets and its Church of St. Martin of the twelfth century.

Artistic Gardens Drulon bring a dynamic tourism for all gardening enthusiasts. Also recall that the town has for years 1 flower at the departmental contest of the cities and villages in bloom standout category.

Population

Sights
 The church of St. Martin, dating from the twelfth century.
 The ruins of a feudal castle at Buchet.
 The fifteenth-century chateau at Drulon.
 The seventeenth-century manorhouse des Girouettes.
 Three watermills, at Drulon, Graveaux and Méséreau.

See also
Communes of the Cher department

References
 Communauté de Communes Terres du Grand Meaulnes

External links

http://www.annuaire-mairie.fr/mairie-loye-sur-arnon.html 

Communes of Cher (department)